Ralfonso "Ralf" Gschwend (born April 29, 1959) is a Swiss kinetic sculptor.

Life and work
Ralfonso received his undergraduate education both in Europe (Schule Schloss Salem, Abitur 1979) and in the United States (USC, Los Angeles, California, BS 1983). He continued his formal education at the  Wharton School of Finance (MBA, 1985).

While working in the real estate field in San Francisco, shortly after receiving his MBA, he began a series of kinetic sculpture drawings, which later served as the basis for his large kinetic sculptures in public places.

He is a designer of environmentally interactive, kinetic, light and sound sculptures (sculptures that interact with the environment such as wind, water, etc.). Since 1999 he specializes in the design and execution of large to monumental kinetic sculptures for public places from his studios in West Palm Beach, Florida, USA and Geneva, Switzerland.

Sculpture designs range in size from 2 ft to 180 ft. Sculptures have been exhibited or installed in Switzerland, Russia,  Netherlands, China, Germany and the USA.

With his passion for Kinetic Art, as president from its inception, he co-founded the Kinetic Art Organization (KAO) www.kinetic-art.org in 2001 with a German and a US fellow Kinetic Artist. Now, with more than 1,000 members in over 60 Countries around the world, KAO has become the largest kinetic art organization in the world. KAO has co-organized Kinetic Art Exhibitions, such as the ART IN MOTION in The Netherlands, St. Petersburg, Russia, and the MomentuM exhibition at Grounds for Sculpture in New Jersey, USA.
In 2006 he established the first kinetic art website in China called KAO CHINA, dedicated to bringing kinetic art to China. Currently he is helping to establish the first Kinetic Art curriculum at the Central Academy of Fine Arts in Beijing.

As an award winner of the Beijing City Sculpture Competition 2007 and a finalist for the "Contest of Landscape Sculpture Designs for Beijing 2008 Olympic Games", Ralfonso was invited to speak at "Olympic Culture and Public Art Conference".  His speech and Dissertation was entitled "Kinetic Art and to Olympic Union of All People".

References

External links
 ART IN MOTION, Leeuwarden, The Netherlands
 Ralfonso.com – Kinetic Art for Public Places
 Kinetic Art Organization (KAO) - KAO - Largest International Kinetic Art Organisation
 KAO CHINA – The first kinetic art website in China
 “Olympic Culture and Public Art Conference” 

Living people
Swiss sculptors
Modern sculptors
Conceptual artists
1959 births